Ashish Malhotra (born 29 September 1973) is an Indian former cricketer. He played one first-class match for Delhi in 2007.

See also
 List of Delhi cricketers

References

External links
 

1973 births
Living people
Indian cricketers
Delhi cricketers
People from Rishikesh